The 1989–90 Rugby Football League season was the 95th ever season of professional rugby league football in Britain. Fourteen teams competed from August, 1989 until May, 1990 for the Stones Bitter Championship, Premiership Trophy and Silk Cut Challenge Cup.

Season summary
Warrington beat Oldham 24–16 to win the Lancashire County Cup, and Bradford Northern beat Featherstone Rovers 20–14 to win the Yorkshire County Cup.

League Tables
Runcorn Highfield became only the second peacetime team in the history of the Rugby Football League to lose every game, and the first since Liverpool City in 1906-1907.

Championship final Standings

Second Division Final Standings

Challenge Cup

Wigan defeated Warrington 36-14 in the Challenge Cup Final at Wembley Stadium on Saturday 28 April 1990 before a crowd of 77,729. Andy Gregory, Wigan's scrum half, was awarded his second Lance Todd Trophy for being the man-of-the-match.

League Cup

Premiership

References

Sources
1989–90 Rugby Football League season at wigan.rlfans.com
Great Britain Competitions 1989-1990 at hunterlink.net.au

1989 in English rugby league
1990 in English rugby league
Rugby Football League seasons